are 3 cm–9 cm cup-sized porcelain vessels. Mass-produced for domestic use in Japan in the Edo Imari period soba choko pro (1620–1886), soba choko were traditionally bundled in a configuration of five.

Background 
Soba choko vessels are true mingei (folkcraft) articles and at the same time exude a subdued yet austere (shibui) spirit in their production, design and use. The wabi sabi of tea ceremony and shibua of soba choko are closely mirrored yet uniquely different. They were used in all households of Edo Japan. It is this use as an inclusive household item used by the masses and differentiates soba choko to all other Japanese ceramics of this period. Soba choko were always bundled in the tradition configuration of five.

Yanagi Soetsu, the founder of Japan's Folkcraft Movement, defined mingei as any 'beautiful object of applied art which served a practical function in their daily lives of people'. Six key features were used to classify an artefact mingei. These include:
 created for the masses
 simple in design
 large production, priced for all to afford
 displaying natural beauty
 incorporates characteristics of the area they were made
 uninfluenced by industrialization — hand made.

Shoki, Chuki and most of Koki era soba choko reflected all these qualities. Those made in the late Meiji (1900–1912), Taisho (1912–1926) and early Showa periods (1926-40s) saw dramatic changes in design and manufacture and therefore no longer reflected true mingei classification.

History 
Soba choko are thought by most scholars to be derived from the Korean word chonchi or chongka- meaning wine cup or bowl. Originally soba choko  were used as spice holders or drinking vessels, but later became primarily used to hold sauce for dipping noodles Ogawa Keishi and Nakano Tari both suggest that the first noodle shop was set up in Osaka during the Kyoho era (1710s) while soba choko were produced and used 60 years earlier. Specifically Nakano sites in historic records that the first noodles were eaten in the Kan'ei era (1620s) but it was not commercialised until the 1710s. Soba choko was produced in various regions of Japan including Imari/Arita (Hizen) in Kyushu, Seto in Aichi, Kirikomi in Sendai and Oda in Tosa. Each region produced their own unique design, colour and form.

The first Imari wares (ko-Imari) commenced production in the second decade of 17th century-perhaps 1620-30 (late Genwa era) and continued until the end of the Tempo era (1844). Imari porcelain production occurred because of two key factors: the discovery of fine white clay deposits in Arita, and the skills and knowledge of Korean/Chinese potters, particularly Yi Sam-pyeong. During the early 17th century many mainland Asian artisans were conscripted and brought to Japan to developed high quality porcelain preparing, throwing, glazing and firing techniques.

Imari production eras 
Dating Edo period Edo era (ko-Imari) soba choko production falls into three distinct periods, Shoki period (1620–1720), Chuki period (1721–1788) and Koki period (1789–1867). Each period characterised design, shape and style transformation. Within in each era there are exceptions in hallmark designs and shapes. Even today experts are not unanimous in dating early ko-Imari.

Soba choko produced in the Meiji (1886–1912), Taisho (1912–1926) and early Showa period (1926-40s) saw a dramatic change in design and production and no longer reflected true mingei production. 

Shoki period soba choko (1620-1720 - Genwa-Kyoho eras) generally featured poorer quality, often disfigured, thick sides and bases with oxide assuming a washed out appearance through thicker clear glaze. As the era progressed refinements and higher quality finishes become the norm. Traditional design were simple hand painted and also used stencils/stamping known as inban. The soba choko was generally heavy in feel. The shape and design were stable and featured similar base, oxide designs and patterning.

Chuki period soba choko (1720–1788) saw a rapid progression of designs and intricate patterns. Kiln stamps appeared and the quality of glazes and porcelain bodies improved. These early to mid era choko featured thin bases and rims, no kiln/era marks (Mikomi-moyo) and no top inner border markings (Renzoku mon). It was only in the last few years of Chuki leading into the Koki period did kiln marks and seals, top inner border patterns start to evolve.

Koki period soba choko spanned the final 78 years of Edo (1789–1867). The period is the easiest to identify. The underside base featured an 'eyeball' style circle (Janome kodai), used kiln marks, had decorative inner borders and also featured at time decorative top rims.

Designs 
Commoners, merchants and nobles alike used soba choko every day. The choko's design, shape and quality indicate the class of society it was designed for. Most soba choko were simple, not too ornate and functional. Traditionally designs were applied onto the porcelain body using cobalt oxide (blue) followed by a coat of clear glaze. The more intricate the design, the whiter the porcelain, quality of glazing/designs and the use of colour (not just blue on white) indicated higher class clientele or specialist production.Designs were hand painted or stenciled in freeform, embedded in frames or placed within bands. Four main design categories were used and included:
 Plants - symbolising prosperity, health and long life
 Landscapes - sea, mountains, temples, garden scenes
 Mingei - geometrics, repeating patterns, seasonal images such as harvests
 Animals - horses, fish, birds, bats, turtles, seaweed, clams and dragons
Certain designs today are highly sought by collectors and usually center around animal design and highly ornate polychrome choko as productions numbers were limited and are very difficult to source today.

Colours 

Four main colours featured on Edo era Imari soba choko. The glazing techniques used on a white porcelain based clay body included: 
 white 
 white with blue underglaze 
 siege (celadon) 
 blue wash with/without gold outline/pattern 
 polychrome - multi-coloured over glazes.

Inner border designs - 'Renzoku mon/Uwa-buchi' 
Inner border designs were used exclusively in the Koki up till the Taisho period. There were multiple border designs. At times the top inner design was mirrored in the mikomi (bottom design). The most common lower border design was an inverted U shape- 'hakama'. This design featured across the late Chuki and the majority of Koki period. This border use is a key element when identifying the period of choko production.

Stamp design - 'Mikomi-moyo'
Two main stamps/seals were commonly placed on soba choko either inside the vessel or on the upper middle bottom of the base. This stamp, its position and design provided information about the kiln, date of production and origin (Imari, Seto, Kirikomi, Tosa etc.).

The use of these stamps or seals emerged in the mid to late Chuki period and were common in the Koki period. Very few soba choko had inside and outside stamps in the earlier Shoki period. Some exceptions to this rule exist and are referred to as 'index' choko that feature a Chuki period base but also include a 'mikomi-moyo' on the inside bottom.

Shapes 

Soba choko featured across each period unique shapes and designs. Based design (kodai), side shape and rims determined period specific production. This is the most important consideration when dating a period of soba choko production. The main shapes include: 
 Betazoku - fluted even taper 
 Han tutsu - raised base tea bowl like 
 Atsude kodai - raised base rim
 Yunomi- taller than wide, trimmed or turned foot 
 Ensori - fluted with ornate folded rim 
 Janome kodai - eye base design.

Bases - 'Kodai' 
Over each period the soba choko bases were unique and provide a key to dating. The pictures below depict typical period styles.

Shoki period kodai, in the earlier stages, were unrefined and robust. The actual edge or rim was thick and formed a clear base either raised or flat. As time progressed the base design became thinner and less weighty. Chuki period bases were characterised by simple clean white bases, refined, with occasional kiln marking stamp - pictogram (mikomi moyo). In the Koki period the base featured a clear eye like centre. The wider the eye the earlier the production.

Border designs - 'Renzoku mon' 
Border designs, referred to as renzoku mon, were in the later few years of the Chuki period and used almost exclusively across the entire Koki period. A variety of design techniques were used with the most common being a triangle/diamond style contained within a thin band.

References

Edo period
Japanese porcelain